Varicellaria is a genus of crustose lichens. It is the only genus in the family Varicellariaceae.

Taxonomy
The genus Varicellaria was circumscribed by Finnish lichenologist William Nylander in 1858, with Varicellaria microsticta assigned as the type species.

The family Varicellariaceae, containing only the type genus Varicellaria, was informally proposed by Brendan Hodkinson, Richard Harris, and James Lendemer in 2011. H. Thorsten Lumbsch and Steven Leavitt formally published the family in 2018. However, the taxon was not validly published because "an identifier issued by a recognized repository was not cited in the protologue", contrary to rules of botanical nomenclature. This nomenclatural oversight was rectified later the same year in a separate publication.

Description
Characteristics of the family Varicellariaceae are similar to those of its genus. These are: a crustose thallus, unicellular green algal photobionts from genus Trebouxia, ascomata in the form of disc-like apothecia, non-amyloid gel in the hymenium, strongly amyloid, one- or two-spored asci, and hyaline, thick-walled, one-layered, one- or two-celled ascospores.

Collectively, the species in genus Varicellaria have a cosmopolitan distribution.

Species

Varicellaria culbersonii 
Varicellaria emeiensis  – China
Varicellaria hemisphaerica 
Varicellaria kasandjeffii 
Varicellaria lactea 
Varicellaria microsticta 
Varicellaria philippina 
Varicellaria rhodocarpa 
Varicellaria velata

References

Pertusariales
Pertusariales genera
Lichen genera
Taxa described in 1858
Taxa named by William Nylander (botanist)